Gururaj Deshpande ("Desh" Deshpande) is an Indian American venture capitalist and entrepreneur, who is best known for co-founding the Chelmsford, MA-based internet equipment manufacturer Sycamore Networks, the Deshpande Center for Technological Innovation at MIT and the Deshpande Foundation.

Presently, Deshpande is the Chairman of A123Systems, Sycamore Networks, Tejas Networks, HiveFire, Sandstone Capital, Sparta Group, and sits on the Board of Airvana.

Deshpande is a Life Member of the MIT Corporation, the Board of Trustees of MIT, and sits on the board of the MIT School of Engineering Dean's Advisory Council (DAC).

In July 2010, Deshpande was appointed by President Barack Obama to the Co-Chairmanship of the National Advisory Council on Innovation and Entrepreneurship, a group established to support the US President's innovation strategy.

Early life and education 
Gururaj Deshpande was born in Hubli, Karnataka in India. His father was a labor commissioner with the Indian government.

He graduated with a Bachelor of Technology in Electrical Engineering from the Indian Institute of Technology Madras. He completed his PhD in Data Communications from Faculty of Engineering & Applied Science at Queen's University in Ontario, Canada and a Master of Electrical Engineering from the University of New Brunswick in Fredericton, New Brunswick, Canada.

Career 
Deshpande started his career at Codex Corporation, a Motorola subsidiary located in Ontario, Canada which manufactured modems, before moving to the U.S. in 1984. Later, he co-founded Coral Networks, a router developer. He left the company prior to its sale in 1993 to SynOptics. He sold the company for $15 million.

Deshpande knew Peter Brackett PhD, a professor of electrical engineering at Queen's university in Ontario for a few years in between industry positions. Brackett offered Deshpande a job at Codex. Brackett also sponsored him for Canadian residency.

In 1990, Deshpande co-founded Cascade Communications, whose products were important in routing the early internet, initially serving as its President and later Executive Vice President; he hired Dan Smith as CEO. He sold Cascade to Ascend Communications for $3.7 billion in 1997.

Subsequently, with the help of MIT researchers, he launched Sycamore Networks in 1998. Sycamore Networks went public in October 1999, and raised a market cap of $18 billion. With his 21% shareholding in hand, this IPO made Deshpande one of the wealthiest self-made businessmen in the world. In 2000, he was featured on the Forbes 400 listing of Richest Americans.

He is also Chairman of A123Systems, which manufactures high-power lithium-ion batteries, which went on NASDAQ in October 2009, and raised $438 million and trading at a 50% premium on the day of listing.

Philanthropy 
Desh, along with his wife Jaishree, donated $20 million to launch the Deshpande Center for Technological Innovation (DCTI) at MIT.

In December 2010, the Deshpandes gave a $5 million pilot grant to start the Merrimack Valley Sandbox (later renamed to Entrepreneurship for All, or EforAll) in Lowell and Lawrence, Massachusetts. Since its inception, Entrepreneurship for All has helped thousands of entrepreneurs launch ventures which, in turn, improves the social and economic well-being of the entrepreneurs and their communities nationwide.

In September 2011, the Deshpande Foundation gave $2.5 million to the University of New Brunswick to launch the Pond-Deshpande Centre for Innovation and Entrepreneurship (PDC). Along with a $2.5 million gift from serial tech entrepreneur Gerry Pond, the PDC was tasked with the mandate of catalyzing more entrepreneurial activity in the province of New Brunswick both traditional market driven entrepreneurship and social mission driven entrepreneurship. Since its inception, the Pond-Deshpande Centre has worked with hundreds of emerging entrepreneurs in Atlantic Canada through early-stage innovation grants, mentorship, new venture acceleration and the hosting of multiple conferences bringing thought leaders together from across North America.

Deshpande was also the Chairman of Akshaya Patra USA from 2008 to 2020.

Awards and honors 
In 2013 he received the IEEE Ernst Weber Managerial Leadership Award.

Personal life 
He is married to Jaishree Deshpande née Kulkarni, who is the sister of Sudha Murthy (wife of Infosys founder Narayan Murthy) and Caltech astrophysicist Shrinivas Kulkarni. She is the co-founder of the Deshpande Center for Technological Innovation at MIT. The couple have two children and live in Chelmsford, Massachusetts, USA. They also maintain a residence in their native Hubli, India.

References

External links 
 Board members at Sycamore Networks

Living people
IIT Madras alumni
Queen's University at Kingston alumni
American people of Indian descent
American businesspeople
American people of Kannada descent
People from Hubli
Year of birth missing (living people)